Government Higher Secondary School for Girls, Cotton Hill is a school for girls located in Vazhuthacaud in the city of Thiruvananthapuram, the capital of the Indian state of Kerala.

Campus 
GGHSS Cotton Hill has a total area of 9 acres of wooded land.

History 
The school opened in 1859 under Maharaja Sri Uthram Thirunal as a free school for girls in Thiruvananthapuram. It operated in the present day Government Sanskrit College building at Palayam until the tenure of C. P. Ramaswami Iyer, the Diwan of Travancore. 

Later it was split into three by C. P. Ramaswami Iyer, one of which located in Paruthikunnu (Cotton Hill) with upper primary (UP) and primary sections, Later it was upgraded to a high school (HS) in 1935 and the lower primary section got bifurcated. The government decided to de-link the UP and HS. Resistance from the public led the government to abandon the plan. 

In 1997, the Kerala Government decided to delink pre-degree courses from universities and introduced two years HSS course (Plus two course) in selected high schools. The school was recognized as a "school of excellence" making it a role model for other schools.

Cotton Hill is one of the first government schools in Kerala to receive a 24x7 CCTV surveillance system to ensure the safety of students

The school educates more than  10,000 students every year. Cotton Hill School is one of the largest girls' school in Asia.

Admission 
Admission is open to the public in standards 5-10 without an entrance test, screening test or recommendation. Admission starts the first week of May. An application costs a fee of Rs 2.

Alumni Association 
An alumni association was formed in October 2009. The former students and teachers of this institution are requested to fill register their name for Rs. 100/- and pay a membership fee of Rs. 100.

Clubs 
The school has active clubs convened by respective departments: English club, Sanskrit club, Energy club, IT Club, NCC, Sports, Forestry club, Health club, Social Science Club, Teenage club.

Rules 
Students must be in uniform in all working days. Students and teachers must attend school assembly on time. The surroundings must be kept neat and clean. They must obey all rules that are passed by the authorities. Students be obedient, polite, honest and sincere.

References

External links
 Official website
 Online Presence and Surveillance Partner

Girls' schools in Kerala
High schools and secondary schools in Thiruvananthapuram